Andrés Fabián Romero (born 8 May 1981) is an Argentine professional golfer who plays on both the PGA Tour and European Tour.

Career
Romero was born in Tucumán. He won his European Tour card by finishing 14th on the Challenge Tour rankings in 2005. His rookie season included a tied for second finish at the Scottish Open and a tied for eighth finish in The Open Championship. Romero finished placed 35th on the Order of Merit.

In the 2007 Open Championship, Romero placed third, behind Sergio García and Pádraig Harrington, making ten birdies on the last day of play. He briefly led the field by two strokes, but made a double bogey on the 17th hole and a bogey on the 18th to miss a play-off by one shot. The following week he won his first European Tour event at the Deutsche Bank Players Championship of Europe. Romero finished the season in the top ten of the Order of Merit, in seventh position.

In July 2007, Romero broke into the top 100 of the Official World Golf Ranking for the first time and he reached a new best of 29th after his Players Championship of Europe win. The next week a top-10 finish in the WGC-Bridgestone Invitational took him into the top 25.

In March 2008, Romero won for the first time on the PGA Tour at the Zurich Classic of New Orleans, and moved to a career high of 21 in the rankings. In 2008 he overtook fellow Argentine Ángel Cabrera to become the highest ranked South American golfer for a short period until he was surpassed by Camilo Villegas of Colombia. He was named the 2008 PGA Tour Rookie of the Year, having three top-10 finishes including his win in New Orleans.

Romero finished runner-up at the 2012 Memorial Tournament, after shooting a final round 67 to get into contention. He finished two strokes behind Tiger Woods after Woods chipped in for birdie on the 16th hole to go clear of the field. Romero moved into the top 125 in the FedEx Cup standings and returned to the world's top 100 as a result. That year he was caddied at the final round of the Open Championship by footballer Carlos Tevez.

Romero broke his hand after punching a sign at the 2015 Barracuda Championship. He failed to meet the terms of his medical exemption and spent two years scratching for starts with only past champion status. In June 2017, he regained his European Tour membership when he won the BMW International Open on an sponsor's invitation. Romero fired a bogey free final round of 65, to come from three strokes behind and win by one stroke from three other players, ending a ten year drought on the European Tour. The win vaulted Romero up over 650 places in the world rankings from 837th to 182nd.

Professional wins (20)

PGA Tour wins (1)

European Tour wins (2)

European Tour playoff record (0–1)

Challenge Tour wins (1)

Tour de las Américas wins (7)
2003 (2) Cable and Wireless Masters Panama, Abierto de Medellin (Colombia)
2005 (1) Roberto de Vicenzo Classic (Argentina)
2006 (1) Torneo de Maestros (Argentina)
2008 (1) Abierto del Litoral1
2010 (1) Abierto del Centro1, Torneo de Maestros1
1Co-sanctioned by the TPG Tour

TPG Tour wins (9)

1Co-sanctioned by the Tour de las Américas

Other wins (3)
2003 North Open
2006 North Open, Abierto del Litoral (Argentina)

Results in major championships

CUT = missed the half-way cut
"T" = tied

Summary

Most consecutive cuts made – 7 (2008 Masters – 2009 Open Championship)
Longest streak of top-10s – 1 (four times)

Results in The Players Championship

CUT = missed the halfway cut
"T" indicates a tie for a place

Results in World Golf Championships
Results not in chronological order prior to 2015.

QF, R16, R32, R64 = Round in which player lost in match play
"T" = tied
Note that the HSBC Champions did not become a WGC event until 2009.

Team appearances
World Cup (representing Argentina): 2006, 2007

See also
2005 Challenge Tour graduates

References

External links

Andrés Romero at the TPG Tour official site

Argentine male golfers
European Tour golfers
PGA Tour golfers
Sportspeople from Tucumán Province
1981 births
Living people